Cathie Linz Baumgardner (29 November 1954, Chicago – 7 March 2015, Chicago) was an American librarian and a USA Today writer of over 50 romance novels under the pen names of Cathie Linz and Cat Devon. Her romance novels are published worldwide in nearly 20 languages.

Biography
Cathie Linz was born on 29 November 1954 in Chicago, Illinois. She was previously employed in Head of Acquisitions at a university law library in the Chicago area. She went on to publish her first book in 1982 and has been the recipient of numerous awards, in addition to being named a lifetime honorary member of the Romance Writers of America. Her romance novels are known for their humor and witty dialogue.

Linz contributed to the landmark book, Dangerous Men and Adventurous Women: Romance Writers on the Appeal of the Romance, a hardcover lead title from the University of Pennsylvania Press which won the distinguished Susan Koppleman Award.

Linz lived in the Chicago area with her family and her cat. The cat, Whiskers, appeared on the cover of the December 2006 issues of Romantic Times. An avid traveler, she had been to the Swiss Mountains, Alaska, and the Grand Canyon.

Linz died on 7 March 2015 in Chicago.

Awards

Romantic Times Career Achievement Storyteller of the Year award
Romantic Times Reviewers' Choice Award
 Readers' Choice Award
Write Touch Award – Best Contemporary Category Romance

Bibliography

As Cathie Linz

Single Novels
Remembrance of Love –  April 1982
Wildfire –  July 1983
A Summer's Embrace – Oct. 1983
A Charming Strategy –  January 1984
A Private Account –  June 1984
Winner Takes All –  Sept. 1984
Pride And Joy – Feb. 1985, Five Star Romance (hardcover reprint), July 1998
A Glimpse of Paradise –  May 1985
Tender Guardian – Sept. 1985, G.K. Hall hardcover, large-print edition, December 1996
Lover And Deceiver –  January 1986
Continental Lover –  July 1986, Thorndike Large Print (Hardcover reprint) 1999.
A Handful of Trouble –  January 1987, Thorndike Large Print (Hardcover reprint) 1999.
Change of Heart –  Feb. 1988
A Friend in Need –  Aug. 1988
As Good As Gold –  March 1989
Adam's Way –  September 1989
Smiles –  June 1990
Handyman –  January 1991
Smooth Sailing –  September 1991
Flirting With Trouble – July 1992
Male Ordered Bride –  January 1993
Escapades –  Aug. 1993
Midnight Ice – March 1994
One of a Kind Marriage –  Sept. 1994, G.K. Hall large-print edition March 1995
Bridal Blues –  November 1994
A Wife in Time – Oct. 1995
Wildfire – G.K. Hall, hardcover, large-print edition, March 1996.  In UK hardcover large-print edition pub. by Chivers Press, June 1996
Husband Needed – September 1997
Daddy in Dress Blues – September 2000, Thorndike Large Print (Hardcover reprint) 2000.
Between The Covers – 2001.
Stranded with the Sergeant – 2001.
Catch of the Day – 2006

Montana Mavericks Series Multi-Author
Baby Wanted—May 1995

Three Weddings and a Gift Series
Michael's Baby – Sept. 1996
Seducing Hunter –  Oct. 1996
Abbie and the Cowboy – November 1996

Too Marriage Makers Series
Too Sexy For Marriage – March 1998
Too Stubborn To Marry –  June 1998
Too Smart For Marriage—August 1998

Best of the West Series
The Rancher Gets Hitched – 1999.
The Cowboy Finds A Bride – 1999.
The Lawman Gets Lucky – April 2000.

Marines, Men of Honor Series
The Marine & The Princess – 2001.
Married to a Marine – 2002.
Sleeping Beauty & The Marine – 2003.
Her Millionaire Marine – 2004.
Cinderella's Sweet-Talking Marine – 2004
The Marine Meets His Match – 2004
The Marine And Me – 2005
Lone Star Marine – 2006

Royally Wed Series Multi-Author
A Prince at Last – 2002

Girls Do Or Don't Series
Good Girls Do – 2006
Bad Girls Don't – 2006
Big Girls Don't Cry'''' – 2007Smart Girls Think Twice-2008

Omnibus in CollaborationThe Rancher Gets Hitched / An Affair of Convenience (1999) (with Marisa Hall)The Cowboy Finds a Bride / The Way We Weren't (1999) (with Isabel Sharpe)The Lawman Gets Lucky / Beauty and the Bet (2000) (with Isabel Sharpe)The Matchmaker's Mistake / Between the Covers (2001) (with Jane Sullivan)A Princess in Waiting / A Prince at Last! (2003) (with Carol Grace)Rancher Gets Hitched / Not Exactly Pregnant (2004) (with Charlotte Maclay)Catch of the Day (2006) (with Beverly Brandt, Pamela Clare and Whitney Lyles)

Non-fiction titlesDangerous Men and Adventurous WomenAs Cat Devon
Entity SeriesSleeping With The Entity (2013)The Entity Within (2013)Love Your Entity (2013)Tall, Dark and Immortal'' (2015)

References

External links

American romantic fiction writers
2015 deaths
1954 births